Bostrychus is a genus of fishes in the family Butidae mostly native to eastern Asia to Australia with one species being found along the Atlantic coast of Africa.  While some of these species are restricted to freshwater, most can be found in marine, fresh and brackish waters.

Species
There are currently nine recognized species in this genus:
 Bostrychus africanus (Steindachner, 1879)
 Bostrychus albooculata (Herre, 1927)
 Bostrychus aruensis M. C. W. Weber, 1911 (Island gudgeon)
 Bostrychus expatria (Herre, 1927)
 Bostrychus microphthalmus Hoese & Kottelat, 2005 	 
 Bostrychus scalaris Larson, 2008 (Ladder gudgeon) 
 Bostrychus sinensis Lacépède, 1801 (Four-eyed sleeper)
 Bostrychus strigogenys Nichols, 1937 (Striped-cheek gudgeon) 
 Bostrychus zonatus M. C. W. Weber, 1907 (Barred gudgeon)

References

Butidae
Taxonomy articles created by Polbot